Carrie Worthley (born 10 January 1983) is an Australian netball player. Worthley played for the Adelaide Thunderbirds in the Commonwealth Bank Trophy (2001–2007), and in the inaugural ANZ Championship season in 2008.

References
2008 Adelaide Thunderbirds profile. Retrieved on 2008-05-31.

1983 births
Living people
Australian netball players
Adelaide Thunderbirds players
ANZ Championship players
Commonwealth Bank Trophy players